Gastrotheca gracilis, commonly known as the La Banderita marsupial frog, is a species of frog in the family Hemiphractidae. It is found in northwestern Argentina and possibly Bolivia.

It dwells in the Southern Andean Yungas montane forests and adjacent high-altitude Central Andean puna grasslands of Catamarca and Tucumán provinces in northwestern Argentina, from 1400 to 2800 meters elevation. It known from five locations, and has an estimated extent of occurrence of 1,407 km2. It assessed as Endangered, and is threatened by habitat loss.

Adults dwell in tree crowns, tree holes, and rock crevices.

During amplexus (breeding), male frogs place eggs in a marsupial pouch on the female's back. The eggs hatch and the larvae develop in the pouch. The females later deposit the larvae in seasonal or intermittent pools and streams to complete their metamorphosis.

References

gracilis
Amphibians of Argentina
Taxonomy articles created by Polbot
Amphibians described in 1969
Southern Andean Yungas